Love in Us All is an album by American saxophonist and composer Pharoah Sanders released on the Impulse! label.

Reception

In his AllMusic review, Nathan Bush stated: "Love in Us All consists of two extended compositions. Together, they serve as an aural representation of the way Sanders' music polarized the jazz world at the time". He noted: "in a way, Coltrane himself never created a work as emotionally direct as 'Love Is Everywhere'."

The authors of The Penguin Guide to Jazz Recordings praised "Love Is Everywhere," calling it "lovely stuff," but noted that Sanders was "towards the end of his time at Impulse! and badly needing a fresh direction."

A writer for Billboard wrote: "The double pocket jacket is a waste. The music is not however, with the title tune a paraphrase of Coltrane on soprano sax."

Ted Davis of Paste Magazine included "Love Is Everywhere" in his list of "The 10 Best Pharoah Sanders Songs," stating that it "captures his sound at its most wonderfully cosmic, esoteric and enlightening—a perfect distillation of all the things that made him such a singular and unforgettable artist."

Track listing
All compositions by Pharoah Sanders
 "Love Is Everywhere" - 19:52   
 "To John" - 20:42

Personnel
Pharoah Sanders - tenor saxophone, flute
Joe Bonner - piano
James Branch - flute 
Cecil McBee - bass
Norman Connors - drums 
Lawrence Killian, James Mtume, Badal Roy - percussion

References

Impulse! Records albums
Pharoah Sanders albums
1974 albums